This is a list of the presidents of Calabria since 1970.

Until the entry into force of Constitutional Law 1/1999, the president of Calabria was elected, like the other members of the executive body of the region, by the Regional Council, among its members. Since the 2000 regional election, the president of Calabria is elected by universal and direct suffrage, appointing and revoking the other members of the executive.

Presidents elected by the Regional Council (1970–2000)

Directly-elected presidents (since 2000)

Timeline

See also

References

 
People from Calabria
Calabria Presidents
Government of Calabria
1970 establishments in Italy
Calabria
Politics of Calabria